Frank Andre van Zanten (born February 1967) is a Dutch businessman, the CEO of Bunzl since April 2016.

Early life
Frank Andre van Zanten was born in February 1967. He has an MBA degree from the Rotterdam School of Management.

Career
Van Zanten worked for his family firm, HOPA, in Amsterdam before it was acquired by Bunzl in the mid 1990s. He went on to be CEO of PontMeyer, the Dutch builders merchants until 2005. van Zanten has worked for Bunzl since 2005, and has been the CEO since April 2016, and a non-executive director of Grafton Group from May 2013 to April 2020.

Personal life
Van Zanten lives in the Netherlands.

References

1967 births
Living people
Dutch businesspeople
Bunzl people
Dutch chief executives
Erasmus University Rotterdam alumni